Neche may refer to:
 Neche tribe, a Caddo tribe from Texas
 Neche, Iran
 Neche, North Dakota, United States